The Småland archipelago (Swedish: Smålands skärgård) is an archipelago in Sweden and one of the largest archipelagos in the world.

Archipelagoes of Sweden
Landforms of Södermanland County